Oxford Studies in Metaphysics is a series of anthology books on metaphysics published by Oxford University Press. The series editors are Karen Bennett and Dean Zimmerman.

References

External links 

 

Series of non-fiction books
Anthology series
Metaphysics books
Oxford University Press books